Ernst Billgren (born 18 November 1957) is a Swedish artist and writer.

Billgren was born in Stockholm and that is where he is currently based. He attended the Valand School of Fine Arts where he graduated in 1987.

His daughter Elsa Billgren is a television presenter. He was previously married to artist Helene Billgren.

Gallery

Public sculpture

Beskyddare (1995), sculpture in bronze and mosaic, in front of the town hall of Solna
Kyrka (2000, erected 2009), sculpture in bronze, Skeppsbron, Stockholm
Fyra årstider (2009), fyra alternerande uppförstorade målningar, shopping centre Nacka Forum, Nacka
Diana (2009), sculpture in bronze, Slottsgatan, Malmö
 Sångfågeln (Melodifestivalskulptur)

Bibliography
Kommittén (novel, 2003)
Vad är konst? (2008)
Prinsen på Lindholmen (2009)
Vad är konst II? (2011)
heter Vägen – en antologi om att göra bra konst, (in collaboration with Jan Åman), published in 1995 by Bonnier Alba.

References

External links
 Official website
 Ernst Billgren; Lars Bohman Gallery

1957 births
Swedish male sculptors
Swedish male writers
Living people
Valand School of Fine Arts alumni